Victory Pictures Corporation was a California-based film production and distribution company that operated from 1935–39. It was owned by Sam Katzman and specialised in making low-budget movies, predominantly Westerns. It made two serials and 30 films, including some of the Western series of Bob Steele and Tim McCoy. It also made eight films based on the works of Peter B. Kyne.

The studio plant caught fire in 1937, causing $50,000 worth of damage.

Selected filmography
 Bars of Hate (1935)
 Danger Ahead (1935)
 Hot Off the Press (1935)
 Put on the Spot (1936)
 Kelly of the Secret Service (1936)
 Feud of the Trail (1937)
 Mystery Range (1937)

References

External links
Victory Pictures Corporation at IMDb
Victory Pictures Corporation at BFI

Mass media companies established in 1935
American companies established in 1935
Film production companies of the United States
Mass media companies disestablished in 1939
1935 establishments in California
1939 disestablishments in California